Tarkio Township may refer to the following townships in the United States:

 Tarkio Township, Page County, Iowa
 Tarkio Township, Atchison County, Missouri